Obi Wali International Conference Centre is a convention center in Port Harcourt, Rivers State, Nigeria. It is named in the honor and
memory of Obi Wali, a prominent political figure from Ikwerreland and is run by the state government.

Plans to build the convention center were drawn up in May 2008. Construction began in 2012 and the facility was officially opened for public use in 2014.

Notable events
Rivers State People's Democratic Party hosted its state convention at this venue in 2016.

 On 10 June 2016, it was announced that the 12th Africa Movie Academy Awards ceremony will be held at the facility on Saturday, 11 June.
 
 Nigerian Optometric Association (NOA) Conference and Expo 2016 will be held here from 13 to 16 July 2016.
 
 The [West African Architecture Festival] (WAAF 2016) was held on the 24th-28 October at the Obi Wali Oil and Gas Conference Center
 
 The [West African Architecture Festival] (WAAF 2017) was also held on the 24th-28 October at the Obi Wali Conference Center
 
 Nigerian Institute of Architects has also announced that The 2018 West Africa Festival is going to be held at the Obi-Wali Conference Center

See also

List of convention and exhibition centers
List of convention centers named after people

References

Entertainment venues in Port Harcourt
Buildings and structures in Port Harcourt
Tourist attractions in Port Harcourt
Convention centers in Nigeria
Event venues established in 2014
Conventions in Rivers State
2014 establishments in Nigeria
2010s establishments in Rivers State
21st-century architecture in Nigeria